Ronin (stylized as RONIN) is a turn-based action platform video game developed by Polish indie developer Tomasz Wacławek, designer at Polish indie studio Flying Wild Hog, and published by Devolver Digital. It was released for Microsoft Windows on 27 May 2015 into Steam Early Access and left it on 30 June 2015. A later update for the game introduced builds for OS X and Linux on 15 October 2015. A PlayStation 4 port of Ronin was released on 1 November 2016.

Gameplay 
Ronin has a stealth-based business complex level design, which the designer Tomasz Wacławek described as a rip-off from Tom Francis' Gunpoint. The player needs to avoid being seen by the guards and use the surprise moment for silent kills. Once in a fight situation, the player has to dodge the guards' attacks and get the right angle to defeat them. The player can also throw their sword at enemies.

The player can hang from the ceiling in a level. This allows them to attack guards without being seen. The guard must be directly under the player and they must not be an elite guard. This attack kills the guard instantly.

Wall climbing is also a mechanic in the game. The player can slide down walls, stick to them, and launch themselves off the wall toward a guard. This also allows the player to reach the ceiling or another area. This gives surprise moments for silent kills.

Plot 
Ronin is about a young girl, known as the "Rōnin", who has lost her father for unknown reasons and the only thing she has left is a photo of five former associates of her father, responsible for his death. The Rōnin is now in charge of self-justice by taking revenge upon those five persons, one at a time.

Development and release 
Ronin was originally created for the itch.io "Cyberpunk" Game Jam, it was submitted under the user name teedoubleu in March 2014. Although it didn't get any high ratings, the highest being place #88 in the category "Relevance", it won the Developer's Showcase and Jury Award at the World of Gamedev Knowledge Conference 2014 (WGK) in Gdańsk, Poland. After having gained a new artist, Łukasz Piskorz, the game's graphics were polished up from pixel art to high-quality 2D art. This change was done not only to make it look better, but also to distinguish it from Gunpoint. Piotr Iwanicki, creative director of Superhot and part of the WGK award jury, gave Wacławek then the idea of handing Ronin over to Devolver Digital, and so he did. Their first public collaborative announcement was the release of Ronin's reveal trailer.

After a longer silent development phase, Wacławek released an updated version of the original Ronin game jam entry, using the new graphics, soundtrack and functions of the full game, to its itch.io page on 20 April 2015, therefore recalling the page from "RONIN" to "RONIN Demo".  The game was initially released onto Steam Early Access on 24 May 2015 for Microsoft Windows, OS X and Linux, however, the OS X  and Linux versions were taken down due to their instability. The game left Early Access on 30 June 2015 for Microsoft Windows only. On 18 June 2015, it was announced that Ronin would be ported to PlayStation 4 and PlayStation Vita. On 15 October 2015, update #9 for the game introduced builds for OS X and Linux. On 1 November 2016, the port of Ronin for PlayStation 4 was released.

Reception 

The PC and PlayStation 4 versions received above-average reviews according to the review aggregation website Metacritic. Reviewers praised the PC version's overall design concept and the alikeness with Gunpoint. Though, people still differentiated them, where Phil Savage of PC Gamer stated that Ronin is "the schlocky B-movie to Gunpoints more cerebral stealth-puzzling". Something that was not as well received was the repetitiveness of some levels, as Matt Porter of Hooked Gamers wrote: "Each of the five people you have to kill are in the same type of boring office building." Ronins lowest review rating was given by Steven Bogos of The Escapist, who said, "Ronin is a remarkably average game. When it works, it's kind of fun, but there just isn't enough here to maintain interest, and it has nothing that we haven't seen before."

References

External links 
 
 

2015 video games
Action video games
Cancelled PlayStation Vita games
Indie video games
Devolver Digital games
GameMaker Studio games
Linux games
Video games about ninja
MacOS games
PlayStation 4 games
PlayStation Network games
Video games developed in Poland
Video games featuring female protagonists
Windows games
Early access video games
Single-player video games